is a railway station on the Minobu Line of Central Japan Railway Company (JR Central) located in the city of Fuji, Shizuoka Prefecture, Japan.

Lines
Tatebori Station is served by the Minobu Line and is located 2.8 kilometers from the southern terminus of the line at Fuji Station.

Layout
Tatebori Station consists of elevated dual opposing side platforms. The ground-level station building has automated ticket machines, automated turnstiles and a staffed service counter.

Platform

Adjacent stations

History
It was elevated to full station status on November 5, 1927 for both passenger and freight services. When the Minobu Line was leased to the national government from October 1, 1938, the station was renamed “Tatebori”. It came under control of the Japanese Government Railways (JGR) on May 1, 1941. The JGR become the JNR (Japan National Railways) after World War II. Freight services were discontinued in 1969. The same year, the tracks from Fuji to Tatebori were double tracked, and the Tatebori Station building was demolished and relocated 400 meters to the east of its former site. Along with its division and privatization of JNR on April 1, 1987, the station came under the control and operation of the Central Japan Railway Company.

Station numbering was introduced to the Minobu Line in March 2018; Tatebori Station was assigned station number CC02.

Passenger statistics
In fiscal 2017, the station was used by an average of 1078 passengers daily (boarding passengers only).

Surrounding area
 Fuji High School

See also
 List of railway stations in Japan

References

External links

   Minobu Line station information	
	

Railway stations in Shizuoka Prefecture
Railway stations in Japan opened in 1927
Minobu Line
Fuji, Shizuoka